Iberomorda is a genus of beetles in the family Mordellidae, containing the following species:

 Iberomorda sulcicauda (Mulsant, 1856)
 Iberomorda viridipennis (Mulsant, 1856)

References

Mordellidae